= Gueltara Mountains =

Small mountain range in western Algeria

Coordinates: 35°16′52″N 1°16′12″W

The Gueltara Mountains are a small mountain range in western Algeria. The mountain summit sits at an elevation of 755 metres.
